Mr Leos caraX (also known as Mr. X) is a 2014 French documentary film written, directed and produced by Tessa Louise-Salomé. The film premiered in-competition in the World Cinema Documentary Competition at 2014 Sundance Film Festival on January 20, 2014.

Synopsis
The film focus on mysterious, solitary French filmmaker, Leos Carax, about his work and his reputation as an icon of world cinema.

Reception
Mr Leos caraX received mixed reviews upon its premiere at the 2014 Sundance Film Festival. In his review for Variety, Guy Lodge said that "Tessa-Louise Salome's documentary is an alluring if not especially illuminating tribute to singular filmmaker Leos Carax." Boyd van Hoeij in his review for The Hollywood Reporter said that "A film that works as a reminder of Carax's unique talents, but isn't quite insightful itself." While, Kyle Burton of Indiewire praised the film by saying that "Louise-Salomé injects the film with his subject's fascinating presence, by arranging clips and overlaying images on the artificially decrepit interview sets. Still, she wisely limits the extent to which her documentary replicates Carax’s ambition."

References

External links
 Official website
 
 

2014 films
2014 documentary films
French documentary films
Documentary films about film directors and producers
2010s French films